London Buses route 205 is a Transport for London contracted bus route in London, England. Running between Paddington and Bow Church, it is operated by Stagecoach London. This bus has operated at Bow Bus Garage, upon its expansion from Mile End to Bow Church.

2015 statistics from Transport for London stated that this route was responsible for the most injuries to cyclists of any TfL bus route in London.

History

Route 205 commenced operating on 31 August 2002, replacing the former SL1 (StationLink 1) service, which had begun as an accessible route called Carelink for disabled people operated by National Bus Company owned Beeline. This route was withdrawn in 1988, and it became a London Transport contracted route. It was initially operated by London General, but in 1992 the contract was won by Thorpes. For a short period the route continued to be branded as Stationlink.

Route 205 was introduced as part improvements in preparation for the introduction of London congestion charge in February 2003. It connects Paddington, Marylebone, Euston, King's Cross and Liverpool Street termini stations, as well as many London Underground stations following the northern part of the Circle line. A route 705, linking stations on the southern section of the Circle Line, was also created but later withdrawn. The contract to operate the new route was won by Metroline.

It was extended from Whitechapel to Mile End tube station on 16 June 2007, and was converted into 24-hour service at the same time. Seven new Scania N230UDs arrived in summer 2007 to increase the frequency of the route.

Upon being re-tendered, on 29 August 2009 the route passed to East London Bus Company. At the same time the route was extended further east, from Mile End to Bow Church. The contract required 25 new buses.

On 31 August 2013, the night service on this 24 hour route was withdrawn and replaced by night bus route N205, the existing night-time services on the 205 was simply re-numbered as N205 and extended to Leyton, Drapers Field via Stratford.

Upon being re-tendered the route was retained by Stagecoach London with a new contract to commence on 30 August 2014 with new Alexander Dennis Enviro400Hs.<ref>Tender News BusTalk (Go-Ahead London) issue 26 February 2014</ref>

In 2018, Transport for London consulted on reducing the frequency of the route.

Current route
Route 205 operates via these primary locations:
Paddington Cleveland Terrace''
Paddington station   
Edgware Road station 
Marylebone station  
Baker Street station 
Regent's Park station 
Great Portland Street station  
Euston Square station 
Euston bus station  for Euston station   
British Library
St Pancras International  
King's Cross station  
Angel station  
Moorfields Eye Hospital
Old Street station  
Liverpool Street station    
Bishopsgate
Aldgate station 
Aldgate East station 
Whitechapel station    for the Royal London Hospital
Stepney Green station 
Mile End station 
Bow Road station 
Bow Church station

References

External links

London Bus Routes gallery
Timetable

Bus routes in London
Transport in the London Borough of Camden
Transport in the London Borough of Islington
Transport in the City of Westminster
Transport in the London Borough of Tower Hamlets